The Hunterian transliteration system is the "national system of romanization in India" and the one officially adopted by the Government of India. Hunterian transliteration was sometimes also called the Jonesian transliteration system because it derived closely from a previous transliteration method developed by William Jones (1746–1794). Upon its establishment, the Sahitya Akademi (India's National Academy of Letters) also adopted the Hunterian method, with additional adaptations, as its standard method of maintaining its bibliography of Indian-language works.

History

The original precursor to the Hunterian system was a transliteration method developed by Charles Wilkins, who is sometimes called the "father of Devanagari typography" because he was also the creator of the first Devanagari typeface. William Jones, who also founded the Asiatic Society, further developed the transliteration method. It was given a more complete form in the late nineteenth century by William Wilson Hunter, then Surveyor General of India. When it was proposed, it immediately met with opposition from supporters of the phonetic Dowler system, which climaxed in a dramatic showdown in an India Council meeting on 28 May 1872 where the new Hunterian method carried the day. The Hunterian method was inherently simpler and extensible to several Indic scripts because it systematized grapheme transliteration, and it came to prevail and gain government and academic acceptance. Opponents of the grapheme transliteration model continued to mount unsuccessful attempts at reversing government policy until the turn of the century, with one critic calling appealing to "the Indian Government to give up the whole attempt at scientific (i.e. Hunterian) transliteration, and decide once and for all in favour of a return to the old phonetic spelling."

Additional languages and adaptations
Over time, the Hunterian method extended in reach to cover several Indic scripts, including Burmese and Tibetan. The Hunterian system was used to establish writing systems that used the Latin alphabet for some Indian languages that were previously not associated with a written script, such as Mizo. In the case of Mizo, the Hunterian-based writing system "has proved hugely successful." Provisions for schwa deletion in Indo-Aryan languages were also made where applicable, e.g. the Hindi कानपुर is transliterated as kānpur (and not kānapura) but the Sanskrit क्रम is transliterated as krama (and not kram). The system has undergone some evolution over time. For instance, long vowels were marked with an acute accent in the original version, but this was later replaced in the 1954 Government of India update with a macron. Thus, जान ('life') was previously romanized as ján but began to be romanized as jān. Some languages of the region are tonal, such as Mizo and Punjabi, and accent marks over vowels have been repurposed to indicate tone for some of them.

Vowels

Main Hindustani vowels with their various representations:

Consonants

In the Hunterian system, implicit schwas are denoted by the transliterated schwa vowel in Devanagari, a (अ), and excluded as necessary under schwa deletion rules. Aspirations are represented by h. Retroflex graphemes are often represented by a diacritic dot under the Latin consonant that represents the equivalent dental graphemes in proposals (some of which predate even the Hunterian method), though this has not officially been accepted by the Indian government. Halants are indicated by either leaving out a vowel after the transliterated consonant or, in new proposals (not formally approved by the Indian government), with a period after the applicable consonant (e.g. जल्दी – jal.di). Initially, italics were sometimes used to differentiate consonants such as ख ("kh") and ख़ ("kh"), but later macrons and diacritics began to be used more extensively.

Examples

Example: मैं अपने संबंधी से कारख़ाने में मिला और उसने मुझे चाय पिलाई। वह बारिश के कारण फ़सलों को हुए नुक़सान की वजह से चिंतित था। मैंने उसे अपनी ख़बर सुनाई। क्योंकि मुझे निकलना था, इसीलिए कुछ देर बाद मैंने क्षमा माँगी और वहाँ से रवाना हुआ।

With diacritics: 

Without any diacritics: 

Notes: संबंधी can interchangeably be written several different ways in Hindi: संबंधी, सम्बंधी, संबन्धी or सम्बन्धी.

Example: इस साल ग्रीष्मकालीन वर्षा ज़्यादा होने से अमरूद और बेर की क़िल्लत देखी गई। मज़े की बात यह है कि सेब और ख़ुबानी की क़ीमतें कम हैं क्योंकि उत्तराखंड में गोदाम भरें हैं.

With diacritics: 

Without any diacritics:

Criticism
The Hunterian system has faced criticism over the years for not producing phonetically accurate results and being "unashamedly geared towards an English-language receiver audience." Specifically, the lack of differentiation between retroflex and dental consonants (e.g. द and ड are both represented by d) has come in for repeated criticism and inspired several proposed modifications of Hunterian, including using a diacritic below retroflexes (e.g. making द=d and ड=ḍ, which is more readable but requires diacritic printing) or capitalizing them (e.g. making द=d and ड=D, which requires no diacritic printing but is less readable because it mixes small and capital letters in words).

See also
William Wilson Hunter
Devanagari transliteration
ISO 15919
International Alphabet of Sanskrit Transliteration
Mizo language writing system

Notes 

 This will only display in the Nastaliq style if you have a suitable Urdu font installed. If this  and this  looks like these four      then you are probably seeing it written in a modern Arabic style.

References

Hindustani orthography
Romanization of Brahmic
Hindi
Sanskrit transliteration